Lex Govan (1914 - July 1996) was a Scottish rugby union player. He was the 92nd President of the Scottish Rugby Union.

Rugby Union career

Amateur career

He played rugby union and cricket for Daniel Stewart's College. On leaving school he played for  Stewart's College FP, playing in the 1st XV at the age of 17. He was one of the side that won the 1937-38 Scottish Unofficial Championship; the first championship title in the club's history.

During the Second World War he joined the Royal Scots but he was back at  Stewart's College FP in 1946 and the club won another championship title.

Provincial career

Govan played for the Scotland Probables in the 1934-35 season. He was never selected for Scotland; the closest he came was being the reserve hooker in the 1946-47 season.

He was capped for Edinburgh District and captained the side.

Administrative career

He served on the  Stewart's College FP committee and was President of the club 1956 to 1958.

He was on the selection committee of Edinburgh District from 1958 to 1961. He was elected to the SRU as a District representative in 1961.

Govan was on the SRU selection committee from 1962 to 1973. He was also a British and Irish Lions selector.

When on the SRU committee Govan persuaded the Scotland selectors that a Head Coach style appointment would be better to look after the team rather than the captain. The person Govan had in mind was Bill Dickinson. Officially termed an 'advisor to the captain' Dickinson was able to coach the players but not have a role in selection. Govan recalled:
I had a bit of a job persuading other members to my way of thinking. Once I had won them round Bill Dickinson was the only candidate. Bill was so enthusiastic and so full of rugby. He was also a very good communicator and once the chaps had confidence in him he took Scottish rugby quite a way forward.

He was Vice-President of the SRU in 1977.

Govan became the 92nd President of the Scottish Rugby Union. He served the standard one year from 1978 to 1979.

As President of the Scottish Rugby Union one of the standard roles was to give the players a stirring speech before kick off in test matches. Jim Renwick recalled Govan's speeches were different: they were to the point:
When Lex Govan was President he used to say things like: 'I've only got three words to say to you boys: Fire and F**king fury!' It was always four or five words instead of three and I remember Ian McGeechan used to aye laugh at that.

Military career
During the Second World War, Govan joined the Royal Scots.

References

1914 births
1996 deaths
Scottish rugby union players
Presidents of the Scottish Rugby Union
Rugby union players from Edinburgh
Stewart's College FP players
Edinburgh District (rugby union) players
Scotland Probables players
Rugby union hookers